Dagona Birds Sanctuary is a waterfowl sanctuary and a tourist centre located in Bade, an LGA in Yobe State, Northeastern Nigeria. It is one of the important regions marked for conservation of avifauna species in Sub-Saharan Africa.

Description 
The Sanctuary is part of the Chad Basin National Park. It is centered around a seasonally flooded ox-bow lake, located at Kuza Fadama on the tributary of the river Hadejia and covers an estimated area of 657 sq. km. Besides the lake, the sanctuary comprises woodland and grassland. Wildlife in it includes Palearctic and Afrotropical migratory water birds, and flora and fauna of both Sudano-Sahel and forest ecological zones. The lake is used as a seasonal stop-over habitat by thousands of exotic birds migrating during the winter from Europe, Americas and Asia.

International visitors 
Several distinguished people have visited the sanctuary, including Prince Bernhard of Netherlands in 1987, Prince Philips in 1989, Prince Charles and Princess Diana in 1990

Climate change 
Climate change has caused both drought and flooding in the sanctuary, alternately drying up the wetlands and washing away nests. Seasonal migrants to the lake are increasingly scarce./>

References 

Tourist activities
Tourism
Tourism by city
Yobe State
Protected areas of Nigeria